David A. Stallworth (December 20, 1941 – March 15, 2017) was an American professional basketball player. He played in the National Basketball Association (NBA) for eight seasons and was a member of the New York Knicks' 1969–70 championship-winning team.

College career

A 6'7" forward/center from Dallas' Madison High School, Stallworth graduated in 1961 and attended Wichita State University. In his three seasons with the Shockers, he set 18 school records, including the highest career point per game average (24.2). Stallworth helped the team reach the 1964 NCAA Men's Division I Basketball Tournament, the school's first appearance in the NCAA Tournament, and was named to the All-American team twice. He earned the nickname "Dave the Rave" while playing at Wichita State.

NBA career
In the 1965 NBA draft, Stallworth was selected in the first round by the New York Knicks, with the third overall pick.

Stallworth played eight seasons (1965–1967; 1969–1975) in the NBA as a member of the Knicks and Baltimore/Capital Bullets.  He averaged 9.3 points per game in his career and won a league championship with New York in 1970. 

Stallworth's play for the Knicks in the 1969–70 season came after he had suffered a heart attack in March 1967, during his second season in the NBA; he had posted a scoring average of 12.6 points per game the previous season. Following a period as a coach for a Wichita-based amateur team, Stallworth was told by his doctor that he could return to playing. 

A back-up on the 1969–70 Knicks, Stallworth was forced into action in Game 5 of the 1970 NBA Finals after Willis Reed was injured early. He was assigned to cover Los Angeles Lakers star Wilt Chamberlain, and aided in holding him in check when on defense. In a game that the Knicks won after trailing by 16, Stallworth made a reverse layup after driving to the basket on Chamberlain in the final minutes; Wayne Coffey, a New York Daily News journalist and writer called it "one of the single most dramatic moments of the season."

Stallworth was traded along with Mike Riordan and an undisclosed amount of cash to the Baltimore Bullets for Earl Monroe on November 11, 1971. He averaged 11.4 points per game and 6.2 rebounds per game in his 64 appearances for the Bullets in 1971–72, but his statistics declined over the next two seasons and the Bullets traded him to the Phoenix Suns in 1974. Stallworth was released by the Suns without playing for the team, and he returned to the Knicks for the 1974–75 season, playing in seven games.

NBA career statistics

Regular season

|-
| style="text-align:left;"|
| style="text-align:left;"|New York
| style="background:#cfecec;"|80* || – || 23.7 || .455 || – || .686 || 6.2 || 2.3 || – || – || 12.8
|-
| style="text-align:left;"|
| style="text-align:left;"|New York
| 76 || – || 24.9 || .466 || – || .716 || 6.2 || 1.9 || – || – || 13.0
|-
| style="text-align:left; background:#afe6ba;"|†
| style="text-align:left;"|New York
| style="background:#cfecec;"|82* || – || 16.8 || .429 || – || .716 || 3.9 || 1.7 || – || – || 7.8
|-
| style="text-align:left;"|
| style="text-align:left;"|New York
| 81 || – || 19.3 || .431 || – || .735 || 4.3 || 1.3 || – || – || 9.4
|-
| style="text-align:left;"|
| style="text-align:left;"|New York
| 14 || – || 16.1 || .375 || – || .829 || 2.5 || 1.8 || – || – || 6.8
|-
| style="text-align:left;"|1971–72
| style="text-align:left;"|Baltimore
| 64 || – || 28.4 || .439 || – || .804 || 6.2 || 2.1 || – || – || 11.4
|-
| style="text-align:left;"|
| style="text-align:left;"|Baltimore
| 73 || – || 16.7 || .414 || – || .772 || 3.2 || 1.5 || – || – || 6.0
|-
| style="text-align:left;"|
| style="text-align:left;"|Capital
| 45 || – || 10.2 || .401 || – || .855 || 2.8 || .6 || .6 || .1 || 4.4
|-
| style="text-align:left;"|
| style="text-align:left;"|New York
| 7 || – || 8.1 || .278 || – || – || 2.9 || .3 || .4 || .4 || 1.4
|- class="sortbottom"
| style="text-align:center;" colspan="2"|Career
| 522 || – || 20.1 || .438 || – || .732 || 4.7 || 1.7 || .6 || .1 || 9.3

Playoffs

|-
| style="text-align:left; background:#afe6ba;"|1970†
| style="text-align:left;"|New York
| 19 || – || 14.5 || .459 || – || .938 || 4.1 || 1.1 || – || – || 7.2
|-
| style="text-align:left;"| 1971
| style="text-align:left;"| New York
| 12 || – || 15.4 || .265 || – || .718 || 3.5 || .8 || – || – || 5.3
|-
| style="text-align:left;"| 1972
| style="text-align:left;"| Baltimore
| 6 || – || 17.5 || .429 || – || .692 || 2.5 || .8 || – || – || 5.5
|-
| style="text-align:left;"| 1973
| style="text-align:left;"| Baltimore
| 3 || – || 4.7 || 1.000 || – || – || 1.0 || .3 || – || – || .7
|- class="sortbottom"
| style="text-align:center;" colspan="2"|Career
| 40 || – || 14.5 || .400 || – || .765 || 3.4 || .9 || – || – || 5.9

Personal
After his playing career ended, Stallworth was employed in Wichita, Kansas by Boeing.

References

External links

1941 births
2017 deaths
All-American college men's basketball players
Amateur Athletic Union men's basketball players
American men's basketball players
Baltimore Bullets (1963–1973) players
Basketball players from Dallas
Boeing people
Capital Bullets players
New York Knicks draft picks
New York Knicks players
Power forwards (basketball)
Small forwards
Wichita State Shockers men's basketball players